The Kansas City-Southern Depot is a historic railroad station at Arkansas Highway 59 and West North Street in Decatur, Arkansas.  It is a long rectangular single-story structure, built out of concrete blocks.  It has a hip roof with Craftsman-style brackets and two fisheye dormers, and a cross-gable projecting telegrapher's bay decorated with fish-scale wood shingles.  It was built c. 1920 by the Kansas City Southern Railway.

The depot was listed on the National Register of Historic Places in 1992.

See also
 Kansas City Southern Railway Locomotive No. 73D and Caboose No. 385
 National Register of Historic Places listings in Benton County, Arkansas

References

Railway stations on the National Register of Historic Places in Arkansas
Railway stations in the United States opened in 1920
National Register of Historic Places in Benton County, Arkansas
Decatur, Arkansas
Kansas City Southern Railway stations
Former railway stations in Arkansas
Transportation in Benton County, Arkansas
American Craftsman architecture in Arkansas
Bungalow architecture in Arkansas
1920 establishments in Arkansas